is a passenger railway station located in the city of Yokosuka, Kanagawa Prefecture, Japan, operated by the private railway company Keikyū.

Lines
Oppama Station is served by the Keikyū Main Line and is located 42.8 kilometers from the northern terminus of the line at Shinagawa  Station in Tokyo.

Station layout
The station consists of two opposed elevated  side platforms by a footbridge with the station building underneath.

Platform screen doors were installed in January 2022.

Platforms

History
The station opened on 1 April 1930, as a station on the Shōnan Electric Railway, which merged with the Keihin Electric Railway on 1 November 1941.

Keikyū introduced station numbering to its stations on 21 October 2010; Oppama Station was assigned station number KK54.

Passenger statistics
In fiscal 2019, the station was used by an average of 42,286 passengers daily. 

The passenger figures for previous years are as shown below.

Surrounding area
 Nissan Motors Oppama Factory
Sumitomo Heavy Industries Yokosuka shipyard

See also
 List of railway stations in Japan

References

External links

 

Railway stations in Kanagawa Prefecture
Keikyū Main Line
Railway stations in Yokosuka, Kanagawa
Railway stations in Japan opened in 1930